Zapady  is a village in the administrative district of Gmina Godzianów, within Skierniewice County, Łódź Voivodeship, in central Poland.

The village has a population of 514.

References

Zapady